"Ridin'" is a 2005 song by Chamillionaire featuring Krayzie Bone.

Ridin' may also refer to:
 "Ridin'" (Mýa song), 2007
 "Ridin'" (NCT Dream song), 2020

See also
 
 Riding (disambiguation)